Wahyu Kristanto (born 6 March 1992) is an Indonesian professional footballer who plays as a defender.

Club career

PSPS Riau
He was signed for PSPS Riau to play in Liga 2 in the 2020 season. This season was suspended on 27 March 2020 due to the COVID-19 pandemic. The season was abandoned and was declared void on 20 January 2021.

International career
He made his debut for Indonesia under-23 national team in friendly match against Singapore U-23 on 13 July 2013 with score 1–0 for Singapore.

Honours

Club
Persisam Putra Samarinda U-21
 Indonesia Super League U-21 runner-up: 2012

References

External links
 Wahyu Kristanto at Soccerway
 Wahyu Kristanto at Liga Indonesia

Living people
1992 births
Association football defenders
Indonesian footballers
Liga 1 (Indonesia) players
Persisam Putra Samarinda players
Bali United F.C. players